The 1976 Citizen's Classic, also known as the Hong Kong Open, was a men's tennis tournament played on outdoor hard courts in Hong Kong. It was the fourth edition of the event and was held from 8 November through 14 November 1976. The tournament was part of the Two Star tier of the 1976 Grand Prix tennis circuit. Fourth-seeded Ken Rosewall won the singles title.

Finals

Singles
 Ken Rosewall defeated  Ilie Năstase 1–6, 6–4, 7–6, 6–0
 It was Rosewall's 3rd singles title of the year and the 41st of his career in the Open Era.

Doubles
 Hank Pfister /  Butch Walts defeated  Anand Amritraj /  Ilie Năstase 6–4, 6–2

References

External links
 ITF tournament edition details

Viceroy Classic
1976 in Hong Kong
Tennis in Hong Kong